Alireza Azimi (born October 12, 1992) is an Iranian footballer who plays for Khoneh Be Khoneh  in the Azadegan League.

Club career
Alizadeh started his career with Rah Ahan at youth levels. He promoted to first team in summer 2012 by the coach, Ali Daei. He scored his first goal for Rah Ahan against Tehrani giant, Persepolis on March 10, 2013.

Club career statistics
Last Update  10 May 2014

References

External links
 Alirea Azimi at Persianleague.com

1992 births
Living people
Rah Ahan players
Iranian footballers
People from Mianeh
Khooneh be Khooneh players
Association football forwards